The 2001–02 season saw Leicester City relegated from the FA Premier League (known as the FA Barclaycard Premiership for sponsorship reasons), ending their 6-year run in England's top flight. A tumultuous season amid rising financial issues would see the Foxes go through four managers and suffer relegation to the First Division in April, finishing bottom of the league with 28 points and just five wins all season.

Season summary
A terrible start to the season saw the Foxes suffer a 5-0 opening-day home defeat to newly-promoted Bolton Wanderers and Peter Taylor sacked at the end of September and Dave Bassett named as his replacement, with Micky Adams joining as assistant manager. For a while, it looked as though Bassett was capable of keeping the Foxes in the Premiership, but a four-month winless run beginning in December killed their survival hopes and they were relegated on 6 April after losing 1–0 at home to Manchester United.

Just before relegation was confirmed, Bassett became Director of Football and Adams was promoted to the manager's seat, with former Cardiff City boss Alan Cork being named as his assistant.

On 11 May 2002, Leicester played their final game at Filbert Street before moving into their new 32,000-seat home. They ended up beating Tottenham Hotspur 2–1 to attain some satisfaction from winning the final game at their 111-year-old home; it was only their fifth league win of the season. The cost of relocation combined with the money lost from relegation plunged Leicester into a serious financial crisis. The priority for next season would be to secure the club's future financially, before thinking about a promotion challenge.

Final league table

Results summary

Results by round

Results
Leicester City's score comes first

Legend

FA Premier League

FA Cup

League Cup

First-team squad
Squad at end of season

Left club during season

Reserve squad

Statistics

Appearances, goals and cards
(Starting appearances + substitute appearances)

Numbers in parentheses denote appearances as substitute.
Players with squad numbers struck through and marked  left the club during the playing season.
Players with names in italics and marked * were on loan from another club for the whole of their season with Leicester.

Assists

Transfers

In

Out

Transfers in:  £7,950,000
Transfers out:  £7,405,000
Total spending:  £545,000

Loan out

Awards

Club awards
At the end of the season, Leicester's annual award ceremony, including categories voted for by the players and backroom staff, the supporters and the supporters club, saw the following players recognised for their achievements for the club throughout the 2001–02 season.

Notes

References

Leicester City F.C. seasons
Leicester City